Charles L. "Chuck" Carr, CAP, is a two-star major general and the former 22nd National Commander of the Civil Air Patrol. He succeeded Maj Gen Amy Courter on August 17, 2011. On August 15, 2014, Maj Gen Carr relinquished command to Maj Gen Joseph Vazquez. He was previously the National Vice Commander and Great Lakes Region Commander.

Education
University of Maryland
NCO Leadership School
Command NCO Academy
USAF Senior NCO Academy

Civil Air Patrol

Commands Held
National Commander of the Civil Air Patrol - (August 17, 2011-August 15, 2014)
National Vice Commander of Civil Air Patrol - (September 4, 2010-August 17, 2011)
Great Lakes Region Commander - (March 1, 2007-September 4, 2010)
Ohio Wing Commander
Ohio Wing Vice Commander
Group VIII Commander
Capt Eddie Rickenbacker Cadet Squadron 803 Commander

Past Military Experience
He retired as a senior non-commissioned officer after serving 23 years in the United States Air Force.

References

Living people
National Commanders of the Civil Air Patrol
United States Air Force airmen
University of Maryland, College Park alumni
Year of birth missing (living people)